Alfred Karl Alfredsson (born 21 October 1964) is an Icelandic sport shooter. He competed at the 2000 Summer Olympics in the men's skeet event, in which he tied for 47th place.

References

1964 births
Living people
Skeet shooters
Icelandic male sport shooters
Shooters at the 2000 Summer Olympics
Olympic shooters of Iceland